Sania Mirza and Elena Vesnina were the defending champions but were defeated in the quarterfinals by Anastasia Pavlyuchenkova and Lucie Šafářová.
The wildcard team then defeated Anabel Medina Garrigues and Yaroslava Shvedova in the final 5–7, 6–4, [10–6].

Seeds

Draw

Draw

External links
 Main draw

Family Circle Cup - Doubles
Charleston Open